Roponen is a Finnish surname. Notable people with the surname include:

Riitta-Liisa Roponen (born 1978), Finnish cross-country skier
Toni Roponen (born 1973), Finnish cross-country coach and commentator
 

Finnish-language surnames